Manic Panic is an album released in 1996 by Swedish singer Leila K via Mega Records.

Track listing

Charts

Sales and certifications

References

1996 albums
Leila K albums